Tapajosella is a monotypic genus of bryozoans belonging to the monotypic family Tapajosellidae. The only species is Tapajosella elongata.

The species is found in Southern America.

References

Phylactolaemata
Bryozoan genera
Monotypic bryozoan genera